"My Way" is a song by American band Limp Bizkit from their third studio album, Chocolate Starfish and the Hot Dog Flavored Water (2000). It was the fourth single released from the album. Most famously, this song was used as the theme song for WrestleMania X-Seven while also was a part of the video package for Stone Cold Steve Austin vs. The Rock for the WWF Championship at that event. It features a prominent sample from Eric B. and Rakim's "My Melody."

Music video
At the beginning of the video, Fred Durst and Wes Borland are conversing on what should be done for the song's music video, as the two have no ideas, and Durst suggests that they check "wardrobe" for ideas, as they have some "really funny stuff in wardrobe". The video then follows the band's various antics as they attempt to film the video in a variety of settings, including a big band where Durst conducts the rest of the band, a line of motorcycles on which they ride, and a jungle with them dressed up as cavemen.

Reception
In 2022, Louder Sound and Kerrang ranked the song number five and number six, respectively, on their lists of Limp Bizkit's greatest songs.

Track listing
 "My Way" (Album Version)
 "My Way" (William Orbit Remix)
 "My Way" (DJ Premier Remix)
 "My Way" (Enhanced Video)
another version (UE version)
 "My Way" (Album Version)
 "My Way" (Pistols Dancehall Dub)
 "My Way" (Dub Pistols Instrumental)
 "Counterfeit" (Lethal Dose Mix)

Charts

Weekly charts

Year-end charts

Certifications

Release history

References

External links
 

2000 songs
2001 singles
Flip Records (1994) singles
Interscope Records singles
Limp Bizkit songs
Music videos directed by Fred Durst
Song recordings produced by Terry Date
Songs written by Fred Durst
Songs written by John Otto (drummer)
Songs written by Sam Rivers (bassist)
Songs written by Wes Borland